Johannes Knab (born 14 September 1946) is a German former cyclist. He competed for West Germany in the team time trial at the 1972 Summer Olympics.

References

External links
 

1946 births
Living people
German male cyclists
Olympic cyclists of West Germany
Cyclists at the 1972 Summer Olympics
Sportspeople from Bamberg
Cyclists from Bavaria